Perené District is one of six districts of the province Chanchamayo in Peru.

References

External links
  Municipal web site

States and territories established in 1986
1986 establishments in Peru